Haunting Me (Hor Taew Taek) is a 2007 Thai supernatural comedy-horror film directed by Poj Arnon.

Synopsis
Jay-Taew, Cartoon, Mot-dum, and Songkram are four aging katoey who run a boarding house for boys in provincial Thailand. After helping cover up the mysterious deaths of local teens "Pancake" and Num-Ning, the teens' spirits haunt the dormitory, forcing the girls to try all sorts of crazy schemes to get rid of the ghosts. Eventually, they realize that the only way to do this is to help the ghosts to avenge their deaths.

Cast
Jaturong Mokjok as Jay-Taew
Sukonthawa Koetnimit as Khaao Tuu
Ekkachai Srivichai as Mot-Dum
Yingsak Chonglertjetsadawong as Cartoon
Kohtee Aramboy as Pancake
Panward Hemmanee as Num Ning
Wiradit Srimalai as Namo
Ratchanont Sukpragawp as Gaai
Thanakorn Jaipinta as Giao
Sophia La as Mom
Anna Mokjok as Policewoman
Somlek Sakdikul as Buckteeth
Siwawat Sappinyo as Sim
Chaiwat Thongsaeng as Main

Sequels
Oh My Ghosts! 2 หอแต๋วแตก แหวกชิมิ (Hor taew tak 2) 2009

Oh My Ghost! 3 หอแต๋วแตก แหกมว๊ากมว๊ากกก (Hor taew tak 3) 2011

Oh My Ghost! 4 หอแต๋วแตก แหกมว๊ากมว๊ากกก‏ (Hor taew tak 4) 2012

Oh My Ghost! 5 หอแต๋วแตก แหกนะคะ‏ (Hor taew tak 5) 2015

External links
 
 
 

 Review by Peter Nellhaus

2007 films
2007 horror films
Five Star Production films
Thai supernatural horror films
2007 comedy horror films
Thai LGBT-related films
Transgender-related films
LGBT-related comedy horror films
2007 comedy films
2007 LGBT-related films
Films directed by Poj Arnon